George Stiles (1760 – January 16, 1819) was a politician and merchant who served as the fourth mayor of Baltimore, in the Democratic-Republican Party, from 1816 to 1819. He served one full term before resigning from his second term, the second resignation of a Baltimore mayor. It is likely that Stiles resigned as a result of bad health, as he died several months later. Stiles died on January 16, 1819.

References

Mayors of Baltimore
Date of birth missing
1819 deaths
1760 births